The following is a list of all team-to-team transactions that have occurred in the National Hockey League during the 1984–85 NHL season. It lists what team each player has been traded to, signed by, or claimed by, and for which player(s) or draft pick(s), if applicable.

Trades between teams

May

June

August

September 

  Trade completed on June 21, 1986.

October

November

December

January

February

March 
 Trading Deadline: March 12, 1985

References

Additional sources
 hockeydb.com - search for player and select "show trades"
 

National Hockey League transactions
1984–85 NHL season